Eveliina Ala-Kulju (née Ojala; 27 October 1867, Lehtimäki – 3 June 1940) was a Finnish schoolteacher, farmer's wife and politician. She was a member of the Parliament of Finland from 1907 to 1910 and again from 1914 to 1919. She represented the Finnish Party until 1918 and the National Coalition Party from 1918 to 1919. Reino Ala-Kulju was her son.

References

1867 births
1940 deaths
People from Lehtimäki
People from Vaasa Province (Grand Duchy of Finland)
Finnish Party politicians
National Coalition Party politicians
Members of the Parliament of Finland (1907–08)
Members of the Parliament of Finland (1908–09)
Members of the Parliament of Finland (1909–10)
Members of the Parliament of Finland (1913–16)
Members of the Parliament of Finland (1916–17)
Members of the Parliament of Finland (1917–19)
People of the Finnish Civil War (White side)
Finnish schoolteachers
20th-century Finnish women politicians
Women members of the Parliament of Finland